Marcel Cousin (born 1896, date of death unknown) was a French tennis player. He competed in the men's singles event at the 1924 Summer Olympics.

References

External links
 

1896 births
Year of death missing
French male tennis players
Olympic tennis players of France
Tennis players at the 1924 Summer Olympics
Place of birth missing